Elaine Constance Smith (born 2 August 1958) is a Scottish actress, comedian, and political activist. She has starred in the BBC Scotland sitcoms City Lights (1984–91), Rab C. Nesbitt (1988–2014) and Two Doors Down (2016–), for which she won a BAFTA Scotland award. Her stage credits include the original productions of The Steamie (1987) and I Dreamed a Dream (2012). She has actively campaigned for Scottish independence.

Biography

Born and raised in Glasgow, Smith attended the Royal Scottish Academy of Music and Drama and then completed a teacher training course at the Queen Margaret University in Edinburgh, where she then worked as a drama teacher at Firrhill High School for three years. She made her first TV debut on the BBC Scotland's Laugh??? I Nearly Paid My Licence Fee in 1984. She then went on to star in sketch show Naked Video and the sitcom City Lights for seven years. Smith made her breakthrough, becoming a household name, after starring as Mary Doll Nesbitt in the BBC sitcom Rab C. Nesbitt. The show ran for nine years and three festive shows were made. 

After Rab C. Nesbitt, she starred in various BBC dramas, including Two Thousand Acres of Sky and 55 Degrees North, and starred as Irene O'Brien in the film Women Talking Dirty. In 2015, she played Valerie Hardcastle in third series of The Syndicate. Smith has starred as Christine in the BBC Scotland's Two Doors Down since 2016. She won the BAFTA Scotland award for Best Actress - Television in 2018 for her performance.

A former member of the Scottish Labour Party, Smith has been an active member of the Scottish National Party (SNP), having declared her support for Scottish Independence.

Early life
Elaine Constance Smith was born on 2 August 1958 in Newarthill, Lanarkshire, to Jim Smith. She attended Braidhurst High School in Motherwell. Smith auditioned for the Royal Scottish Academy of Music and Drama, now the Royal Conservatoire of Scotland, at the age of 16 and was enrolled to complete a teaching course. She moved to Edinburgh and finished her teacher training at the Moray House College. In the late 1970s, Smith began working as a drama teacher at Firhill High School in Edinburgh. At University she was involved in student politics and after becoming a teacher she became active in trade union politics.

Career

Television 
In 1984, she made her TV debut on the BBC Scotland comedy Laugh??? I Nearly Paid My Licence Fee; however, her first major television appearance came in 1986 as a star of the sketch show Naked Video. Made by BBC Scotland, it was shown throughout the UK on BBC2. In between seasons of Naked Video, Smith also starred in the Scottish sitcom City Lights, which ran for seven years on the BBC. 

Smith is best known for her role as Mary 'Mary Doll' Nesbitt in the BBC sitcom Rab C. Nesbitt, a series based on characters in a Naked Video sketch. Launched in 1990 and set in Glasgow, the show was a cult hit, and ran for nine years on BBC Two. The show was revived for a Christmas special in 2008, two new series in 2010 and 2011, and a New Year special in 2014.

Smith has appeared in the BBC dramas Two Thousand Acres of Sky and 55 Degrees North, performed alongside Helena Bonham Carter in the British film Women Talking Dirty, and toured Scotland with her stand-up comedy show. In October 2007, she appeared in an episode of the Jennifer Saunders sitcom The Life and Times of Vivienne Vyle.

In 2010 she took part in an STV tribute to Scottish actor Gerard Kelly. In January 2011, she appeared on Celebrity Mastermind with singer-songwriter Joni Mitchell as her specialist subject. She finished second on the programme.

Since 2015, Smith has presented a documentary-style show entitled Burdz Eye View, broadcast by STV, in which she tours Scotland with her comedy act and talks about Scottish life and culture.

In 2015, Smith had a part in the third series of Kay Mellor's BBC drama The Syndicate.

In 2016, she began starring in the BBC Scotland sitcom Two Doors Down. She won the BAFTA Scotland award for Best Actress - Television in 2018 for her performance.

Theatre 

For many years she was a regular in pantomime at the Kings' Theatre, Glasgow, starring alongside Gerard Kelly in performances such as Aladdin, Mother Goose and Sleeping Beauty. More recently, she has appeared in her own seasonal show, 12 Nights of Christmas at the Òran Mór, Glasgow.

She has also toured Scotland in straight plays, notably with Andy Gray, in The Woman Who Cooked Her Husband, Two and The Rise and Fall of Little Voice. Other notable Scottish theatre roles include The Steamie, Guys and Dolls and Shirley Valentine. She has also performed in new works at the Tron Theatre, Glasgow and the Traverse Theatre, Edinburgh.

In September 2008 she began touring the UK in a stage version of the hit British film Calendar Girls, along with Lynda Bellingham, Patricia Hodge, Siân Phillips, Gaynor Faye and Brigit Forsyth. The show opened in London's West End at the Noël Coward Theatre in April 2009. The original cast left the show at the end of July 2009, but Smith returned in a different role as part of a national tour in 2010.

From 2009 to 2016, Smith starred in Christmas pantomimes at His Majesty's Theatre, Aberdeen. In 2017 she returned to pantomimes at the King's Theatre, Glasgow.

In 2012, she played Scottish singer Susan Boyle in the touring musical I Dreamed a Dream (which she co-wrote with Alan McHugh), based on Boyle's life and rise to fame. There were plans to tour the show in Australia in 2013 but these were cancelled.

In 2016, Smith toured Scotland as Miss Hannigan in the musical Annie. In 2017, she toured Scotland in a musical version of Kay Mellor's Fat Friends.

Honours 
She was awarded the honorary degree of Doctor of the University by the University of Glasgow in 2008.

Personal life
Smith lives in Glasgow. 

In August 2007, she was appointed to the Scottish Broadcasting Commission established by the Scottish Government. 

Until 2009, Smith wrote a weekly column in the Sunday Mail newspaper.

In late 2009, her autobiography, Nothing Like a Dame, was published.

Activism 

In May 2007, Smith declared her support for Scottish independence by aligning herself with the Scottish National Party. She had previously been a member of the Labour Party but left due to its failure to publicly back the 1984–85 miners' strike.

She is a supporter of numerous charities, including Zero Tolerance and Relationships Scotland. She is also the patron of the Women and Girl's Programme at Celtic FC. In 2021 she became patron of The Tall Ship Glenlee on their 125th Birthday. The ships’ figurehead had been named Mary Doll after Smith’s famous character as Mary Doll Nesbitt.

Filmography

Television

Film

Publications

References

External links

1958 births
Living people
Actresses from Glasgow
Alumni of Queen Margaret University
Alumni of the Royal Conservatoire of Scotland
People educated at Braidhurst High School
People from Baillieston
Scottish autobiographers
Scottish columnists
Scottish film actresses
Scottish musical theatre actresses
Scottish nationalists
Scottish stage actresses
Scottish stand-up comedians
Scottish television actresses
Scottish television personalities
Scottish women comedians
Scottish women columnists
Scottish republicans
Women autobiographers